Stanisław Dawidczyński (born 29 September 1944) is a Polish football manager.

References

1944 births
Living people
Sportspeople from Łódź
Polish footballers
ŁKS Łódź players
MKS Cracovia (football) players
Gwardia Warsaw players
Polish football managers
Polonia Warsaw managers
Hutnik Warsaw managers
OKS Stomil Olsztyn managers
Association footballers not categorized by position